Aude Amadou (born 29 February 1980) is a French politician of Renaissance (RE) who served as the member of the French National Assembly from 2017 to 2022, representing the 4th constituency of the department of Loire-Atlantique.

Early life and career
A former professional handball player, Aude was frequently the captain of her teams in Nice and Toulun Saint-Syr, where she played division 1 and 2 handball.

Political career
In parliament, Amadou serves as member of the Committee on Foreign Affairs. In addition to her committee assignments, she is a member of the French delegation to the Assemblée parlementaire de la Francophonie (APF).

She lost her seat in the second round of the 2022 French legislative election to Julie Laernoes from EELV.

Political positions
In July 2019, Amadou voted in favour of the French ratification of the European Union’s Comprehensive Economic and Trade Agreement (CETA) with Canada.

See also
 2017 French legislative election

References

1980 births
Living people
Deputies of the 15th National Assembly of the French Fifth Republic
La République En Marche! politicians
21st-century French women politicians
Women members of the National Assembly (France)
French handball players
Members of Parliament for Loire-Atlantique